Unfaithful is a 2002 erotic thriller film directed and produced by Adrian Lyne and starring Richard Gere, Diane Lane, Olivier Martinez, Erik Per Sullivan, Chad Lowe, and Dominic Chianese. It was adapted by Alvin Sargent and William Broyles Jr. from the 1969 French film The Unfaithful Wife by Claude Chabrol. It tells the story of a couple living in suburban New York City whose marriage goes dangerously awry when the wife indulges in an affair with a stranger she encounters by chance.

Unfaithful grossed $52 million in North America and $119.1 million worldwide. Despite mixed reviews overall, Lane received much praise for her performance. She won awards for Best Actress from the National Society of Film Critics and New York Film Critics, and was nominated for a Golden Globe and an Academy Award for Best Actress.

Plot

Edward and Connie Sumner live in upscale Westchester County, New York with their eight-year-old son, Charlie. Their marriage is loving but monotonous and complacent. While shopping in the city, the wind knocks Connie into stranger, Paul Martel, and they both fall over. Seeing that she has scraped her knee, Paul invites her to follow him up to his apartment to treat her injury. Connie decides to follow Paul upstairs. After cleaning her knee, she comes out of the bathroom to find Paul has made her tea. Paul puts an ice pack on her leg as she is on the phone with her son and then puts his hand on hers as she holds it in place. Connie gets off the phone and Paul takes the opportunity to introduce himself. Connie introduces herself by first name only and says she has to go. Paul insists she take one of his books and directs her to a specific book, pointing her to page 23, which starts with a passage about seizing the opportunities of the moment. Connie, feeling uncomfortable, leaves. 

Later finding Paul's phone number inside the book he gave her, she calls him from Penn Central. He invites her over and when she arrives, he again flirts with her. She leaves despite their mutual attraction, but returns a third time, and they share a dance. Again uncomfortable, Connie rushes out. Returning moments later to retrieve her coat, Paul literally sweeps her off her feet, carries her off to bed, and they have sex. Connie is simultaneously turned on and terrified at what she is doing. However, they both relish the thrill of their affair, and Connie uses her work as an excuse to continue visiting Paul.

Edward catches her in a lie involving a family friend, which makes him suspicious. Noticing Connie buying herself sexy new lingerie and becoming increasingly distracted, he later catches her in another lie about having a salon appointment. Edward then fires an employee for perceived disloyalty, and the employee, having seen Connie and Paul together, tells Edward he needs to look at his own family. Edward hires a private investigator and is devastated when he provides pictures of Connie and Paul together. The affair takes its toll on Connie, but even though she feels increasingly guilty, she cannot bring herself to end it; until one day she is late to pick up Charlie from school.

Realizing she can no longer carry on the affair, she drives to Paul's the following day to end things in person. Discovering him with another woman heading to the library, she confronts him. They argue in the elevator and she questions him on how many women is he seeing. Paul claims the other woman is only just a friend and nothing more. A furious Connie tells Paul that she hates him, calls him a liar and mentions that their affair is over for good. She angrily pushes Paul out of her way and starts walking away. She storms out of Paul's apartment but he chases after Connie and catches up with her. He then quickly begins to seduce her and she tries fighting and pushing him off her. She eventually gives up and they have passionate sex in the hallway of his apartment. She leaves, narrowly missing Edward, who has arrived to confront Paul. Paul lets him into his apartment and they discuss Connie. Edward is stunned to find a snow globe he had given her in the past, which Paul explains she had gifted to him. Edward becomes overwhelmed and snaps, fracturing Paul's skull with the snow globe, killing him instantly. While cleaning up the evidence, Edward overhears a crying Connie leave a phone message for Paul, saying that she is ending the affair and that she is tired of lying and hurting her family. Edward erases the message and puts Paul's body in the trunk of his car, later dumping it in a landfill.

Finding her number on Paul's desk, NYPD detectives arrive at the Sumner home, explaining that Paul's estranged wife had reported him missing. Connie is surprised to hear he had a wife, and claims she barely knows him. The detectives return a week later to reveal that Paul's body has been discovered. Edward and the detectives notice Connie visibly react upon hearing the news. Later, when taking Edward's clothes to the dry cleaner, she finds the photos of her and Paul, and looks distraught as she realizes Edward knows about her infidelity. At a party that night she notices that the snow globe she gifted Paul has been returned to their collection. Sharing a meaningful look with Edward, she realizes he may have had something to do with Paul's disappearance.

She later confronts him, but he turns it back on her for what she has done. Confessing, Edward says that he had known all along and that he had wanted to kill her instead of Paul. In the days that follow, Connie discovers a hidden compartment in the snow globe containing a memo Edward had placed there years earlier.  She finds a photograph of her, Edward, and an infant Charlie, with the message ″To My Beautiful Wife, the Best Part of Every Day!″ Realizing how much he loved her, she gives Edward a painful look of deep remorse. As she later burns the photographs of her and Paul, she says she is frightened.  Edward says he will turn himself in, but Connie objects, saying they will find a way to move on, and they briefly appear to return to a normal life together.

But on their way home from an event one evening, Edward stops at a red light with Charlie asleep in the backseat. Connie falls into an escape fantasy that they could leave the country and assume new identities, and Edward agrees it sounds perfect.  Consoling her as she begins crying, it is revealed that Edward has stopped the car next to a police station.

Cast

Ahmad Harhash as Ricky Johnson

Production

Development
According to actor Richard Gere, an early draft of the screenplay presented the Sumners as suffering from a dysfunctional sexual relationship, which gave Connie some justification for having an affair. According to the actor and to director Adrian Lyne, the studio wanted to change the storyline so that the Sumners had a bad marriage with no sex, to create greater sympathy for Connie. Both men opposed the change; Lyne in particular felt that the studio's suggestions would have robbed the film of any drama: "I wanted two people who were perfectly happy. I loved the idea of the totally arbitrary nature of infidelity." The Sumners' relationship was rewritten as a good marriage, with her affair the result of a chance meeting.

Pre-production
During pre-production, the producers received a videotaped audition from Olivier Martinez, who was selected for Paul. His character was portrayed as French once Martinez was cast. Lyne said, "I think it helps one understand how Connie might have leapt into this affair—he's very beguiling, doing even ordinary things." Once cast in the role, Martinez, with Lyne's approval, changed some of his dialogue and the scene in which he first seduces Lane's character, while she is looking at a book in Braille. According to Martinez, "The story that was invented before was much more sensual, erotic and clear."

Lyne cast Diane Lane in the role of Constance after seeing her in the film A Walk on the Moon. He felt that the actress "breathes a certain sexuality. But she's sympathetic, and I think so many sexy women tend to be tough and hard at the same time." Lyne also wanted Gere and Lane to gain weight in order to portray the comfort of a middle-age couple. In particular, he wanted Gere to gain 30 pounds and left donuts in the actor's trailer every morning.

Lyne asked director of photography Peter Biziou, with whom he made 9½ Weeks, to shoot Unfaithful. After reading the script, Biziou felt that the story was appropriate for the classic 1.85:1 aspect ratio because it "so often has two characters working together in the frame". During pre-production, Biziou, Lyne and production designer Brian Morris used a collection of still photographs as style references. These included photos from fashion magazines and shots by prominent photographers.

Filming
Initially, the story was set against snowy exteriors, but this idea was rejected early on. Principal photography began in New York City on March 22, 2001 and wrapped on June 1, 2001 with Lyne shooting in continuity whenever possible. During the windstorm sequence where Connie first meets Paul, it rained and Lyne used the overcast weather conditions for the street scenes. The director also preferred shooting practical interiors on location so that the actors could "feel an intimate sense of belonging", Biziou recalls. The cinematographer also used natural light as much as possible.

At times, Lyne's directing took its toll on the cast and crew. In a scene taking place in an office, the director pumped it full of smoke, an effect that "makes the colors less contrasty, more muted". According to Biziou, "The texture it gives helps differentiate and separate various density levels of darkness farther back in frame". The smoke was piped in for 18 to 20 hours a day and Gere remembers, "Our throats were being blown out. We had a special doctor who was there almost all the time who was shooting people up with antibiotics for bronchial infections". Lane acquired an oxygen bottle in order to survive the rigorous schedule.

The film has many explicit sex scenes, including a tryst in a restaurant bathroom and a passionate exchange in an apartment building hallway. Lyne's repeated takes for these scenes were demanding for the actors, especially for Lane, who had to be emotionally and physically fit for the scenes. To prepare for the initial love scene between Paul and Constance, Lyne had the actors watch clips from Fatal Attraction, Five Easy Pieces, and Last Tango in Paris. Lane and Martinez would also talk over the scenes in his trailer beforehand. Once on the set, they felt uncomfortable until several takes in. She said, "My comfort level with it just had to catch up quickly if I wanted to be the actress to play it." Martinez was not comfortable with nudity. Lane said that Lyne would often shoot a whole magazine of film, "so one take was as long as five takes. By the end, you're physically and emotionally shattered."

Lane had not met Martinez before filming, and they did not get to know each other well during the shoot, mirroring the relationship between their characters. A full four weeks of the schedule was dedicated to the scenes in Paul's loft, which was located on the third floor of a six-story building located on Greene Street. Biziou often used two cameras for the film's intimate scenes to reduce the number of takes that had to be shot.

Post-production
Lyne shot five different endings to Unfaithful based on his experiences with Fatal Attraction, whose initial ending was rejected by the test audience. According to Lyne, he had some debate with the 20th Century Fox officials, who wanted to "make the marriage gray, the sex bad. I fought that. I tried to explore the guilt, the jealousy—that's what I'm interested in." The studio did not like the film's "enigmatic" ending, which they felt failed to punish crimes committed by the characters. It imposed a "particularly jarring 'Hollywood' final line", which angered Gere.

Following negative reactions from test audiences, the studio reinstated the original ending; a few weeks before the film was to open in theaters, Lyne asked Gere and Lane to return to Los Angeles for reshoots of the ending. Lyne claimed that the new ending was more ambiguous than the original and was the original one by screenwriter Alvin Sargent. Lyne also thought the new ending "would be more interesting and provoke more discussion", saying he intentionally "wanted to do a more ambiguous ending, which treats the audience much more intelligently".

Reception

Box office
Unfaithful was released in 2,617 theaters in the United States on May 10, 2002, and grossed US$14 million on its first weekend, with an average of $5,374 per screen. It made $52 million in the U.S. and Canada, and a total of $119 million worldwide, well above its $50 million budget.

Critical response
On Rotten Tomatoes the film has a rating of 50% based on 165 reviews, with an average rating of 5.80/10. The consensus reads, "Diane Lane shines in the role, but the movie adds nothing new to the genre and the resolution is unsatisfying." On Metacritic the film has a weighted average score of 63 out of 100, based on reviews from 34 critics, indicating "generally favorable reviews". Audiences surveyed by CinemaScore gave the film a grade "C+" on scale of A to F.

CNN film critic Paul Tatara wrote, "The audience when I saw this one was chuckling at all the wrong times, and that's a bad sign when they're supposed to be having a collective heart attack." Entertainment Weekly critic Owen Gleiberman awarded the film an "A−" grade and praised Lane for delivering "the most urgent performance of her career", writing that she "is a revelation. The play of lust, romance, degradation, and guilt on her face is the movie's real story." Roger Ebert of the Chicago Sun-Times wrote, "Instead of pumping up the plot with recycled manufactured thrills, it's content to contemplate two reasonably sane adults who get themselves into an almost insoluble dilemma." Kenneth Turan of the Los Angeles Times wrote, "The only performer who manages to get inside her character is Lane. Whether it's her initial half-distrustful tentativeness, her later sensual abandon or her never-ending ambivalence, Lane's Constance seems to be actually living the role in a way no one else matches, a way we can all connect to."

Stephen Holden in The New York Times praised the "taut, economical screenplay" that "digs into its characters' marrow (and into the perfectly selected details of domestic life) without wasting a word. That screenplay helps to ground a film whose visual imagination hovers somewhere between soap opera and a portentous pop surrealism." USA Today gave the film three-and-a-half out of four and Mike Clark wrote, "Diane Lane also reaches a new career plateau with her best performance since 1979's A Little Romance." In his review for The Washington Post, Stephen Hunter wrote, "In the end, Unfaithful leaves you dispirited and grumpy: All that money spent, all that talent wasted, all that time gone forever, and for what? It's an ill movie that bloweth no man to good." David Ansen, in his review for Newsweek, wrote, "Unfaithful shows what a powerful, sexy, smart filmmaker Lyne can be. It's a shame he substitutes the mechanics of suspense for the real suspense of what goes on between a man and a woman, a husband and a wife." Andrew Sarris, in his review for the New York Observer, wrote, "Ultimately Unfaithful is escapism in its purest form, and I am willing to experience it on that level, even though with all the unalloyed joy on display, there's almost no humor," and concluded that it was "one of the very few mainstream movies currently directed exclusively to grown-ups".

Accolades
The studio campaign's theme consisted of what the studio called the film's "iconic scene": Constance recalling her first tryst with Paul as she takes a train home. According to Tom Rothman, chairman of Fox Filmed Entertainment, "That scene captured the power of her performance. It's what everyone talked about after they saw her." Four days before the New York Film Critics Circle's vote, Lane was given a career tribute by the Film Society of Lincoln Center. A day before that, Lyne held a dinner for the actress at the Four Seasons Hotel. Critics and award voters were invited to both. Lane won the National Society of Film Critics, the New York Film Critics Circle awards and was nominated for a Golden Globe and an Academy Award for Best Actress. Entertainment Weekly ranked Unfaithful the 27th on their "50 Sexiest Movies Ever" list.

References

External links

 
 
 

2002 films
2002 thriller drama films
2000s erotic thriller films
2002 crime drama films
2002 crime thriller films
20th Century Fox films
Adultery in films
American crime drama films
American crime thriller films
American erotic thriller films
American remakes of French films
American thriller drama films
Crime film remakes
Erotic romance films
Films about infidelity
Films directed by Adrian Lyne
Films scored by Jan A. P. Kaczmarek
Films set in New York City
Films shot in New Jersey
Films shot in New York (state)
Films with screenplays by Alvin Sargent
Regency Enterprises films
Thriller film remakes
2000s English-language films
2000s American films